Papava is a Georgian surname. Notable people with the surname include:
Giorgi Papava (born 1993), Georgian football player
Marlen Papava (born 1941), Soviet sports shooter
Vladimer Papava (born 1955), Georgian scientist

Surnames of Georgian origin
Georgian-language surnames
Surnames of Abkhazian origin